Santo Tomé is a city in the province of Santa Fe, Argentina. It is located only 9 km from the capital city (Santa Fe). It has a population of about 65,684 inhabitantsand estimated at 80,000 inhabitants based on population growth rate provided by the INDEC, and is classified as a second-category municipality.

History
The town of Santo Tomé was founded in 1872 by the provincial government, and became a city on 12 April 1962.

Personalities
Adriana Aguirre (b. 1951), actress, vedette
Mauricio Martínez (b. 1993), footballer

References

External links

Populated places in Santa Fe Province
Cities in Argentina
Argentina
Santa Fe Province